The Mazda BT-50 is a compact/mid-size pickup truck produced by the Japanese manufacturer Mazda since 2006. It is a larger version of the predecessor B-Series pickup and is not sold in the Japanese and North American markets. The second-generation Ranger has been designed by Ford Australia, with a Mazda derivative sold as the BT-50. The third-generation BT-50 was revealed in 2020, now based on the Isuzu D-Max.



First generation (J97M; 2006) 

The BT-50 was launched at the Bangkok International Motor Show on 22 March 2006. It shares its Duratorq/MZR-CD 2.5- and 3.0-liter diesel inline-four engines with the Ranger. In late November 2006, the new five-speed automatic transmission with Borg Warner transfer case has been added, as well as side airbags.

The BT-50 received a minor redesign in the first quarter of 2008, with a revised interior and several optional items made standard.

The model sold in Mexico and Central and South America includes these options:
 A 2.6-liter straight-4 4x4 only, same engine and transmission used in the previous Mazda B2600
 A 2.2-liter straight-4 4x2 only, entry-level model same as the old B2200
 A 2.5-liter diesel straight-4 either 4x2 or 4x4

Production 
European and Thai models of the Ford Ranger and Mazda BT-50 are built in Thailand. South African Ford Ranger and Mazda BT-50 models are built in Pretoria, South Africa. Latin American Mazda BT-50s are built in Colombia, replaced by the Ford Ranger T6 built in Argentina since 2012.
Mazda BT-50 was also assembled by the Willowvale Mazda Motor Industries in Zimbabwe from 2007 to 2010 and the most significant BT-50 assembled was the one on a 2.2litre F2 petrol engine. 
The Mazda BT-50 is neither sold nor built in Japan.

Second generation (UP, UR; 2011) 

A full model change of the Mazda BT-50 was revealed in October 2010 at the Australian International Motor Show. It is based on the Ford Ranger (T6).

While the BT-50 version was designed by a Mazda team based at Ford Australia's design center in Melbourne, both Ford and Mazda worked independently. Of the exterior panels, only the windscreen, roof, and rear screen are common between the Ranger and BT-50, although the underpinnings are largely the same.

Facelift 
A revised BT-50 for the 2016 model year debuted in July 2015 and launched into the Australian market in September 2015. The UR series facelift is mainly cosmetic without any changes in engine specifications, however, several equipment changes and slight price differences over the pre-facelift model are present. Another facelift for the second generation BT-50 was launched for the Australian market in 2018. Changes includes revised looks and Apple CarPlay and Android Auto support through an Alpine sound head unit.

Pangolin Edition 
In November 2020, Mazda Philippines launched the BT-50 4x4 Pangolin Edition to raise awareness of the endangered pangolin. This variant featured a matte black grille, aluminum roof rack, roll bars, riveted fender flares, 17-inch Rota alloy wheels, and a white pangolin decal on each side.

Third generation (TF; 2020) 

The third generation BT-50 was unveiled in Australia on 17 June 2020. Unlike its predecessors, the BT-50 was developed from the third generation Isuzu D-Max. The pickup is a result of a tie-up between Mazda and Isuzu which was announced on 11 July 2016, with Isuzu agreeing to supply pickup trucks to Mazda. An Isuzu executive told Australian media CarsGuide that Mazda had no involvement in the development of the D-Max, and that Mazda will be handed a finished pick-up truck instead.  As the result, the TF BT-50 is built at Isuzu Motors plant in Samrong, Samut Prakan, Thailand.

The vehicle features the Mazda's Kodo design language similar to its crossover line-up. While it still shares the base structure, body shell and the wing mirrors with the Isuzu D-Max, Mazda made most of the body panels unique. It is powered by the Isuzu-sourced 3.0-litre 4JJ3-TCX inline-four turbo-diesel engine, replacing the 3.2-litre MZ-CD inline-five Ford Duratorq turbodiesel engine.

For the first time, the third generation BT-50 is available with adaptive cruise control which is aided by twin cameras in the windscreen rather than a radar sensor in the grille, as to make the installation of off-road accessories in the front of the vehicle possible. Autonomous emergency braking, blind zone warning, rear cross-traffic alert, lane-keeping assistance and centre airbags are also available in select trims.

Markets

Thailand 
The model was released in Thailand on 21 January 2021. It features a smaller 1.9-litre engine.

Philippines 
In the Philippines, the third generation BT-50 was released on 17 November 2021. It comes in two trims: 4x2 Standard (6-speed manual and automatic) and 4x4 Premium (automatic only). All variants are powered with the 3.0-litre 4JJ3-TCX engine.

Malaysia 
In Malaysia, the third generation BT-50 was launched on 30 November 2021. It comes in four trims: 1.9 Single Cab 4x4 (manual only), 1.9 Mid 4x4 (manual and automatic), 1.9 High 4x4 (automatic only) and 3.0 High Plus 4x4 (automatic only).

Sales

References

External links 
 Official website (Australia)

BT-50
Pickup trucks
Cars introduced in 2006
2010s cars